This  list of systems engineering at universities gives an overview of the different forms of systems engineering (SE) programs, faculties, and institutes at universities worldwide. Since there is no clear consensus on what constitutes a systems engineering degree, this list simply identifies the college and department offering degrees and the degrees offered.

Education in systems engineering is often observed to be an extension to the regular engineering courses, reflecting the industry attitude that engineering professionals need a foundational background in one of the traditional engineering disciplines (e.g. civil engineering, electrical engineering, industrial engineering) plus professional, real-world experience to be effective as systems engineers. Undergraduate university programs in systems engineering are rare.

Education in systems engineering can be viewed as systems-centric or domain-centric. 
 Systems-centric programs treat systems engineering as a separate discipline with most courses focusing on systems engineering theory and practice.
 Domain-centric programs offer systems engineering topics as an option that can be embedded within the major domains or fields of engineering.
Both categories strive to educate the systems engineer with capability to oversee interdisciplinary projects with the depth required of a core-engineer.

The International Council on Systems Engineering (INCOSE)  maintains a continuously updated Directory of Systems Engineering Academic Programs worldwide.

Systems engineering degrees in Europe

Systems engineering degrees in the US 
As of 2009, some 75 institutions in United States offer 130 undergraduate and graduate programs in systems engineering.

Systems Engineering degrees in other countries

Research institutes for systems engineering 

In Asia:
 Research Center for Modeling & Simulation, National University of Science and Technology, Islamabad, Pakistan.
In Europe:r
Hasso Plattner Institute related to the University of Potsdam, Germany.
 Informatics Research Centre at the University of Reading Business School, Reading, Berkshire, England, UK.
 I2S - Institut d'ingénierie des systèmes  at the École Polytechnique Fédérale de Lausanne in Lausanne, Switzerland.
 Systems Engineering Estimation and Decision Support (SEED)  at the University of the West of England CEMS, Bristol, England, UK.
Technical University of Hamburg, Hamburg, Germany.
 UCL Centre for Systems Engineering (UCLse) in the Mullard Space Science Laboratory, London, England, UK.
 Research Centre for Automatic Control (CRAN), joint research unit with Nancy-Université and CNRS, Nancy, France

In the USA:
GTRI Electronic Systems Laboratory (ELSYS) at the Georgia Tech Research Institute, Atlanta, Georgia, USA.
GTRI Aerospace, Transportation and Advanced Systems Laboratory at the Georgia Tech Research Institute, Atlanta, Georgia, USA.
Systems Engineering Research Center  at Stevens Institute of Technology, Hoboken, New Jersey, USA.
Western Transportation Institute at Montana State University, Montana, USA.

In the Caribbean:
INTEC Instituto Tecnológico de Santo Domingo at Los Proceres, Santo Domingo, Dominican Republic.

See also 
 List of types of systems engineering
 List of systems engineering books (WikiProject System list)
 List of systems engineers
 List of systems science organizations

References

External links 
 INCOSE "Directory of Systems Engineering Academic Programs World Wide"

Systems e
Systems engineering